William Andrewes Fearon (4 February 1841 - 29 April 1924) was an Anglican priest.

He was born into an ecclesiastical family, educated at Winchester and New College, Oxford, where he was a Fellow from 1864 to 1867 and president of the Oxford Union in 1864. He was ordained deacon in 1867 and priest the following year. He had a tutor’s house at his old school from 1867 to 1882, during which time he married Mary Freeman, the daughter of an Archdeacon of Exeter when he became Headmaster of Durham School. He was Examining Chaplain to the Bishop of Newcastle from 1882 to 1884 when he returned to Winchester, where he was Headmaster until 1901. He was Archdeacon of Winchester from 1903 to 1920, Examining Chaplain  to the Bishop of Winchester from 1903 to 1915; and Canon  of Winchester from 1906 until 1920.

Notes

1865 births
People from Babergh District
People educated at Winchester College
Fellows of New College, Oxford
Headmasters of Winchester College
Archdeacons of Winchester (ancient)
Presidents of the Oxford Union
1924 deaths